Agyneta rurestris is a species of sheet weaver found in the Palearctic. It was described by C. L. Koch in 1836.

References

rurestris
Spiders described in 1836
Spiders of Europe
Palearctic spiders